Lafayette Historic District is a national historic district located at Lafayette, Montgomery County, Virginia.  The district encompasses 19 contributing buildings in the village of Lafayette. It includes principally single family dwellings of frame construction dating from about 1830 to 1940. Notable buildings include the Pepper House (c. 1829), Lafayette Methodist Church (c. 1847), Sid Butt Barbershop and House (1940), Gardner Store, and Butt Store.

It was listed on the National Register of Historic Places in 1991.

References

Historic districts in Montgomery County, Virginia
National Register of Historic Places in Montgomery County, Virginia
Historic districts on the National Register of Historic Places in Virginia